Scopula roseocincta is a moth of the family Geometridae. It is found in South Africa and Tanzania.

References

Moths described in 1899
roseocincta
Insects of Tanzania
Moths of Africa